The WOI Tower (also called NYT Broadcast Holdings Tower, for WHO-TV's former owner) is a  high guy-wired mast located in Alleman, Iowa, United States, north of the Des Moines urban area, at . It carries not only the signal of ABC affiliate WOI-TV (channel 5), but also NBC affiliate WHO-TV (channel 13), and PBS member station KDIN (channel 11) as well as NPR member station WOI-FM (90.1). The structure is one of the very few masts to have elevators.

The tower was completed in 1972 and is property of Nexstar Media Group, the owner of WHO-TV, Iowa Public Television and Iowa State University.

External links

http://www.skyscraperpage.com/diagrams/?b7116

Buildings and structures in Polk County, Iowa
Towers in Iowa
Radio masts and towers in the United States
Towers completed in 1972
1972 establishments in Iowa